The 2003 edition of the Campeonato Carioca kicked off on January 16 and ended on March 23, 2003. It is the official tournament organized by FFERJ (Federação de Futebol do Estado do Rio de Janeiro, or Rio de Janeiro State Football Federation. Only clubs based in the Rio de Janeiro State are allowed to play. Twelve teams contested this edition. Vasco da Gama won the title for the 22nd time. Volta Redonda was relegated.

System
The tournament was divided in two stages:
 Taça Guanabara: The 12 clubs all played in single round-robin format against each other. Top four teams advanced to the Taça Rio. 
 Taça Rio: The remaining four teams went into a knockout tournament to define the champion.

Championship

First stage

Semifinals

Finals

References

Campeonato Carioca seasons
Carioca